Signeta flammeata, the bright shield-skipper, is a butterfly of the  family Hesperiidae. It is found in the Australian Capital Territory, New South Wales, Queensland, South Australia and Victoria.

The wingspan is about 30 mm.

The larvae feed on Poa tenera, Tetrarrhena juncea and other Tetrarrhena species. They construct a shelter made of grass stems loosely held together with silk. They rest in this shelter during the day. Pupation takes place in the shelter.

External links
Australian Insects
Australian Faunal Directory

Trapezitinae
Butterflies described in 1882
Butterflies of Australia
Taxa named by Arthur Gardiner Butler